The Memorial Argo Manfredini is a tennis tournament held in Sassuolo, Italy since 2000. The event is part of the ''challenger series and is played on outdoor clay courts.

Past finals

Singles

Doubles

External links 
Official website
ITF search

ATP Challenger Tour
Sassuolo
Tennis tournaments in Italy
Clay court tennis tournaments